Mycobacterium virus D29 (D29) is a Cluster A mycobacteriophage belonging to the Siphoviridae family of viruses, it was discovered in 1954 by S. Froman. D29 is notable for its ability to infect M. tuberculosis (the causative agent of tuberculosis). D29 is a double stranded DNA mycobacteriophage. It is a lytic phage, this means that D29 takes the lytic pathway of infection instead of the lysogenic pathway of infection. There are no human associated diseases associated with mycobacterium virus D29.

Viral Classification 
Mycobacterium virus D29 is a Caudovirales virus belonging to the Siphoviridae family. These are commonly referred to as T5-Like Phages. Mycobacterium phage T5 was the first of the siphoviruses found with the structure consistent throughout the Siphoviridae viruses, which is why they are referred to as T5-Like Phages.

Mycobacteriophage are broken up into 33 genomically distinct groups. 26 of these groups are known as clusters (Cluster A-Z) and there are 7 singleton groups. D29 belongs to Cluster A, subcluster A2. Subcluster A2 has a unique distinction of being one of a few groups known to infect tuberculosis along with A3 and Cluster K phages. This is important as it emphasizes these clusters and subclusters for potential importance in dealing with tuberculosis, as it is still one of the leading causes of death in certain parts of the globe.

Genome 
Mycobacterium virus D29 is a double stranded DNA mycobacteriophage that has a genome length of 49127 base pairs (bp), coding for a total of 77 protein coding genes. Five tRNA genes are also present in D29's genome (genes 6-9.2). The G+C content of the D29 genome is 63.6%, which is similar to that of other T5-Like Phages.

Sequencing of D29 has shown that it is indeed very similar to that of certain T5-Like Phages. L5 and some other siphoviruses have a similar layout to the genomes as D29 does. The attachment site for D29 is at a very similar location on its genome to that of L5. The attachment site divides the genome into the left and right arms of the genome. The left arm of D29 is about 80% identical to L5 in terms of nucleic acids. The right arm is where the differences lie between D29 and L5 (and some of the other T5-Like Phages), sequences of the right arm are highly related between D29 and L5, but "punctuated by segments of unrelated DNA". The right end of the D29 genome has a 3.6 kb deletion in comparison to that of L5 at the far right end of the arm. This deletion seems to affect the repressor gene 71 and surrounding genes. This would appear to be why D29 is a lytic phage instead of a temperate phage like L5.

The left arm of D29 encodes gene 1 through gene 33, some of which are involved in head subunits, tail subunits, the five tRNA genes, and Integrase. The functions for multiple different genes are unknown. The right arm encodes for genes 34.1 through 89. Not all of these genes are protein coding, but the right arm likely encodes for DNA Polymerase, Haloperoxidase, potentially DNA primase, and a few others that are only hypothesized.

Replication 
Mycobacterium virus D29 is a big DNA phage, this just means that it carries a large genome. With a genome length over 49000 bp long, D29 is considered to have a large genome size. Large genome sizes generally point to a replication process that is commonly referred to as rolling circle model of DNA replication. The DNA is packaged and stored in the protein head of the phage in a linear fashion. But after infecting cells the linear genome is converted into a circle, this allows for continuous DNA synthesis. The length of the circular DNA is equal to that of the linear DNA length except it is missing one terminal repeat section. This form of DNA replication is very common in mycobacteriophages.

Release of Phage 
The release of mycobacteriophages from the host is done through a procedure working throughout the replication and assembly period of the phage. Since D29 only takes the lytic pathway of infecting hosts, a D29 infection of a mycobacterium always results in the death of the host. Lysis is a procedure in which after the phage has irreversibly attached to the cell and injected its DNA into the host, and after phage particles have been assembled, the cell wall is broken, or lysed releasing the phage into the environment for further infection. D29 has three genes which operate together to achieve this. Gene gp10 which encodes for the protein Lysin A, gene gp11 which encodes for the holin protein, and gene gp12 which encodes for Lysin B. Together these three proteins have a lethal effect on the infected bacteria. Essentially, the holins form pores in the cell membrane of the host. These pores allow for the Lysin A and Lysin B to cooperate to reach and breach the peptidoglycan to bust open the cell walls. This process releases the newly assembled phage particles into the environment but also kills the cell.

Structure 
The morphotype of mycobacterium virus D29 is that of Siphoviridae. The family is known to have an icosahedral head, with long, flexible, non-contractile, thin tails. D29 has an average head diameter of around 80 nm. The tails vary between 3 different sizes, the tails can be about 150, 300, or 450 nm in length. The tail has an average diameter of approximately 12 nm. The tail leads to a site at the distal end where three L-shaped tail fibers exist, at this point, the "tubular tail undergoes a transition at the tail fiber attachment site to a conical form, which tapers into a single straight tail fiber". These structural measurements are common throughout the T5-Like Phages. As T5-Like phages refers to the morphology of the phage, or the structure and outward appearance. Some of the T5-Like phages are extremely similar to D29 in other respects though, such as the mentioned L5 phage.

There are 6 structural polypeptide proteins in the viral structure, three larger polypeptides named polypeptide III, polypeptide IV, and polypeptide VI. There are three minor polypeptides known as polypeptide I, polypeptide II, and polypeptide V. There are no lipids present in the virus or that the virus requires.

Tropism 
D29 can infect a large variety of mycobacterium. The host range of D29 is known to be broad indicating the ability to bind to receptors that are common among many types of mycobacteria. These receptors are not well documented or studied at this time though, some are known, but few. These mycobacterial species include both pathogenic bacteria (e.g. M. tuberculosis), and non-pathogenic bacteria (e.g. M. smegmatis).
This makes D29 a rather effective control phage in studies involving mycobacteriophages. Mycobacteriophages are not dangerous to humans as they cannot affect the cells of the human body nor can they affect the bacteria living in the human biome.

Phage Therapy 
D29 serves as a potential candidate for bacteriophage used in phage therapy. With its broad host range, and ability to infect M. tuberculosis, it is heavily thought that D29 could be used effectively in combating dangerous pathogens in a safe manner. For example, D29 would be able to infect M. tuberculosis without really affecting the human host. This is because of the non-lysogenic abilities of D29. Since D29 only engages in the lytic cycle, D29 kills the infected bacteria which is the desired effect in terms of phage therapy.

It has also been suggested that instead of using D29 and other such phages for actively combating current infection (of Tuberculosis for example), phage be given to family members and other working in constant close proximity to the infected individual to hold off the acquiring of the pathogen. This as an effective method has only been suggested and the actual effectiveness of the strategy has yet to be tested.

References 

Siphoviridae